The George Davidson Medal is awarded by the American Geographical Society for the "exceptional achievement in research for exploration in the Pacific Ocean or the lands bordering therein". In 1946, the American Geographical Society received a bequest of $5000 from his daughter Ellinor Campbell Davidson to establish the medal and a research fund to honor her father. The medal was designed by American sculptor Paul Manship in 1951.

History
George Davidson was a geographer and scientist noted for his work with the U.S. government exploring and charting the western United States and Alaska. Davidson was a geodist for the U.S. Coast and Geodetic Survey, working heavily in the Pacific waters. He later became a professor at the University of California. In 1907, he published The Discovery of San Francisco Bay.

Recipients
Source: American Geographical Society

See also

 List of geography awards

References

Further reading

External links
 Official website

Awards of the American Geographical Society
Awards established in 1946
1946 establishments in the United States
Works by Paul Manship